Andreas Hofmann may refer to:

 Andreas Joseph Hofmann (1752–1849), German philosopher and revolutionary
 Andreas Hofmann (footballer) (born 1986), footballer for Karlsruher SC
 Andreas Hofmann (javelin thrower) (born 1991), German javelin thrower